Radio City 107.0 is a Swedish radio station.

Radio City 107.0 was a former radio station for students in Lund. They changed the name to Radio City 107.0 in January 1997, SBS, now ProSiebenSat.1 Media AG joined as a dominion owner that same year.

Radio City 107.0 is the only local station in Malmö. This is the only 100% local station, in strong competition with six commercial and government radio station. Every show and program is produced in a studio in central Malmö.

In 2006, Radio City 107,0 and Mix Megapol were amalgamated. The new name of the station was Mix Megapol Radio City.

The station's main target is people between the ages of 20-40.

Radio stations in Sweden
ProSiebenSat.1 Media
Mass media in Lund
Mass media in Malmö